was a Japanese science fiction fanzine published from 1957 until its 204th issue in 2013. It was Japan's first science fiction fanzine. It was awarded a special Seiun Award in 1982 as Japan's oldest science fiction fanzine, and received an honorable mention for Best Amateur Magazine at the 1962 Hugo Awards.

History
Uchūjin began publication with the May 1957 issue. Science fiction author and translator Takumi Shibano as the founding editor, making it the oldest Japanese science fiction fanzine.

The club changed its name to Uchūjin before the first issue, and focused on science fiction writing, translation, critique, and related topics. Since the first issue, many of its contributors went on to become well-known speculative fiction writers, including Sakyō Komatsu, Yasutaka Tsutsui, Ryū Mitsuse, Shinji Kajio, Akira Hori, Kōji Tanaka, Yoshinori Shimizu, Baku Yumemakura, and Masaki Yamada.

At the first Nihon SF Taikai in 1962 (which Shibano chaired), Uchūjin held a fifth anniversary party. They also released a self-parody fanzine titled  in the same year. Three collections of the best works from the magazine were released. The magazine publishing frequency changed from monthly to annual in 1973, with the 200th issue being published in 2007. The final issue contained memorial tributes to Shibano, including an interview with his widow.

Contributors
The following writers contributed to Uchūjin over the years:
Kazumasa Hirai
Tadashi Hirose
Akira Hori
Shinichi Hoshi
Fujio Ishihara
Eisuke Ishikawa
Norio Itō
Shinji Kajio
Ichirō Kanō
Sakyo Komatsu
Tadashi Kōsai
Aran Kyōdomari
Taku Mayumura
Hiroshi Minamiyama
Ryu Mitsuse
Tsutomu Miyazaki
Kōsei Ono
Eiichirō Saitō
Hakukō Saitō
Yoshinori Shimizu
Kōji Tanaka
Aritsune Toyota
Yasutaka Tsutsui
Katsufumi Umehara
Masaki Yamada
Tetsu Yano
Baku Yumemakura

Best collections
Several collections of works from Uchūjin were published in Japan.
 series: Volumes 1-3  (May 1977, Kodansha), published for the 20th anniversary of the fanzine
 series, published for the 30th anniversary of the fanzine
Volume 1:  (December 1987, Kawade Shobō Shinsha)
Volume 2:  (December 1987, Kawade Shobō Shinsha)
 edited by Takumi Shibano, published for the 40th anniversary of the fanzine
Volume 1 (December 1997, Shuppan Geijutsusha)
Volume 2 (December 1997, Shuppan Geijutsusha)

Awards and honors
Uchūjin has received the following awards and honors:

References

External links

 

Defunct literary magazines published in Japan
Doujinshi
Science fiction magazines published in Japan
Magazines disestablished in 2013
Magazines established in 1957
Science fiction fanzines
Science fiction organizations
Defunct literary magazines